Baba Marta Beach, Nelson Island
 Baba Tonka Cove, Livingston Island 
 Bablon Island, Graham Coast
 Bacho Kiro Peak, Danco Coast
 Bager Island, Wilhelm Archipelago
 Bagra Peak, Sentinel Range 
 Bagryana Point, Greenwich Island
 Baklan Point, Nelson Island
 Bakshev Ridge, Rugged Island
 Baktriana Reef, Snow Island
 Balabanski Crag, Foyn Coast
 Balan Ridge, Alexander Island 
 Balanstra Glacier, Brabant Island
 Balchik Ridge, Livingston Island 
 Baley Nunatak, Trinity Peninsula 
 Balgari Nunatak, Alexander Island
 Balis Ridge, Danco Coast
 Balkan Snowfield, Livingston Island 
 Balkanov Peak, Liège Island
 Mount Balkanska, Alexander Island
 Ballester Point, Livingston Island
 Ballestilla Reef, Snow Island
 Balsha Island, Livingston Island 
 Balvan Point, Nordenskjöld Coast
 Banari Glacier, Clarence Island
 Bangey Heights, Sentinel Range 
 Bankya Peak, Davis Coast 
 Bansko Peak, Livingston Island 
 Bardarevo Hill, Trinity Peninsula 
 Barutin Cove, Snow Island
 Barziya Peak, Loubet Coast
 Basarbovo Ridge, Brabant Island
 Batak Point, Smith Island 
 Batil Spur, Sentinel Range
 Batkun Peak, Nordenskjöld Coast
 Battenberg Hill, Livingston Island 
 Batuliya Point, Robert Island 
 Baurene Island, Graham Coast
 Baykal Point, Brabant Island
 Beadnos Nunatak, Sentinel Range
 Bebresh Point, Liège Island 
 Bekas Rock, Livingston Island 
 Belchin Rock, Livingston Island 
 Belene Cove, Livingston Island 
 Belev Nunatak, Livingston Island
 Belgun Peak, Trinity Peninsula 
 Belimel Bay, Trinity Island 
 Belitsa Peninsula, Trinity Peninsula 
 Belogradchik Glacier, Oscar II Coast
 Belogushev Island, Biscoe Islands
 Belomortsi Point, Livingston Island
 Beloslav Peak, Sentinel Range 
 Belozem Hill, Livingston Island 
 Bendida Peak, Trinity Peninsula 
 Benkovski Nunatak, Greenwich Island 
 Berende Cove, Greenwich Island 
 Bergison Peak, Bastien Range
 Beripara Cove, Liège Island
 Berisad Glacier, Sentinel Range 
 Berkovitsa Glacier, Livingston Island 
 Beroe Hill, Livingston Island 
 Beron Point, Robert Island 
 Berrister Gap, Livingston Island
 Bersame Glacier, Clarence Island
 Bersin Ridge, Oscar II Coast
 Bertius Inlet, Wilkins Coast
 Besapara Hill, Livingston Island 
 Beslen Island, Low Island
 Besson Rock, Nelson Island
 Bezbog Peak, Trinity Peninsula 
 Bezden Peak, Sentinel Range 
 Bezenšek Spur, Trinity Peninsula 
 Bezmer Point, Livingston Island
 Bigla Ridge, Foyn Coast 
 Bikorn Lake, Robert Island
 Bilyana Island, Aitcho Islands 
 Bilyar Point, Livingston Island 
 Binkos Point, Danco Coast
 Biolchev Peak, Foyn Coast
 Biruni Island, Elephant Island
 Biser Point, Graham Coast 
 Bistra Glacier, Smith Island 
 Bizone Rock, Snow Island
 Blagoevgrad Peninsula, Oscar II Coast
 Blagun Glacier, Graham Coast
 Blenika Peak, Sentinel Range
 Blesna Peak, Brabant Island
 Boatin Island, Robert Island
 Bodloperka Island, Wilhelm Archipelago
 Boeritsa Point, Livingston Island
 Bogdan Ridge, Greenwich Island 
 Bogomil Cove, Rugged Island 
 Bohot Nunatak, Sentinel Range
 Boil Point, Trinity Peninsula
 Boisguehenneuc Bay, Liège Island 
 Bolbabria Cove, Liège Island
 Bolgar Buttress, Nordenskjöld Coast 
 Bolgrad Glacier, Sentinel Range 
 Bonev Peak, Danco Coast
 Bononia Cove, Nelson Island
 Borda Rock, Smith Island
 Borima Bay, Oscar II Coast
 Borovan Knoll, Trinity Peninsula 
 Boryana Glacier, Nordenskjöld Coast
 Mount Bosnek, Oscar II Coast
 Botev Peak, Livingston Island 
 Botev Point, Livingston Island 
 Bourchier Cove, Smith Island 
 Bov Point, Brabant Island
 Bowles Ridge, Livingston Island 
 Bowles West Peak, Livingston Island
 Boyadzhiev Point, Elephant Island 
 Boyana Glacier, Livingston Island 
 Boynik Point, Desolation Island 
 Bozhinov Glacier, Danco Coast 
 Bozveli Peak, Trinity Peninsula 
 Brahe Rock, Livingston Island
 Branishte Peak, Sentinel Range
 Brashlyan Cove, Smith Island
 Bratsigovo Hills, Trinity Peninsula 
 Brauro Cove, Snow Island
 Brenitsa Glacier, Oscar II Coast
 Brentopara Inlet, Oscar II Coast
 Breste Cove, Tower Island 
 Breze Peak, Alexander Island
 Breznik Heights, Greenwich Island 
 Brichebor Peak, Vinson Massif 
 Bris Rock, Nelson Island
 Brocks Peak, Sentinel Range
 Bruguière Peak, Sentinel Range 
 Brusen Point, Greenwich Island 
 Buache Peak, Two Hummock Island
 Buchino Rocks, Greenwich Island 
 Bulgarian Beach, Livingston Island 
 Buneva Point, Alexander Island 
 Bunovo Peak, Fallières Coast
 Buragara Cove, Brabant Island
 Burdenis Glacier, Sentinel Range
 Burdick South Peak, Livingston Island 
 Burdick West Peak, Livingston Island 
 Burel Hill, Desolation Island 
 Burevestnik Glacier, Brabant Island
 Burgas Peninsula, Livingston Island 
 Burya Point, Trinity Island
 Butamya Glacier, Graham Coast
 Butrointsi Point, Two Hummock Island
 Byaga Point, Graham Coast

See also 
 Bulgarian toponyms in Antarctica

External links 
 Bulgarian Antarctic Gazetteer
 SCAR Composite Gazetteer of Antarctica
 Antarctic Digital Database (ADD). Scale 1:250000 topographic map of Antarctica with place-name search.
 L. Ivanov. Bulgarian toponymic presence in Antarctica. Polar Week at the National Museum of Natural History in Sofia, 2–6 December 2019

Bibliography 
 J. Stewart. Antarctica: An Encyclopedia. Jefferson, N.C. and London: McFarland, 2011. 1771 pp.  
 L. Ivanov. Bulgarian Names in Antarctica. Sofia: Manfred Wörner Foundation, 2021. Second edition. 539 pp.  (in Bulgarian)
 G. Bakardzhieva. Bulgarian toponyms in Antarctica. Paisiy Hilendarski University of Plovdiv: Research Papers. Vol. 56, Book 1, Part A, 2018 – Languages and Literature, pp. 104-119 (in Bulgarian)
 L. Ivanov and N. Ivanova. Bulgarian names. In: The World of Antarctica. Generis Publishing, 2022. pp. 114-115. 

Antarctica
 
Bulgarian toponyms in Antarctica
Names of places in Antarctica